Joy Aloysius Thomas (1 January 1963 – 28 September 2020) was an Indian-born American information theorist, author and a Senior Data scientist at Google. He was known for his contributions to information theory and was the co-author of Elements of Information Theory, a popular text book which he co-authored with Thomas M. Cover. He also held a number of patents and was the founder of startups such as 'Insights One'.

Biography 
Joy Thomas, born on January 1, 1963, in the south Indian state of Kerala, did his schooling at St Joseph's Boys' High School, Bangalore. He stood first in the IIT Joint Entrance Examination. After graduating from the Indian Institute of Technology, Madras, he migrated to the US where he continued his studies to secure a PhD from Stanford University in 1984. It was here, he met with Thomas M. Cover, the renowned information theorist and together they wrote a book in 1991, Elements of Information Theory, which is considered by many as a benchmark text book on the subject. In 1990, he joined the IBM Research at the Thomas J. Watson Research Center as a research staff member where he worked until he became involved in the founding of  Stratify, a startup founded in 1991, which was later rebranded as Iron Mountain Digital. Later, he founded InsightsOne, another startup which was subsequently acquired by Apigee in 2014.

Joy Thomas was an adjunct professor at Columbia University and Stanford University and held a number of patents. He died on September 28, 2020, at Mountain View, California, at the age of 57, survived by his wife, Priya, and children, Joshua and Leah.

Patents

Selected bibliography

Books

Articles

References

External links 
 
 
 

1963 births
2020 deaths
Writers from Kerala
American information theorists
Data scientists
American inventors
IIT Madras alumni
Stanford University alumni
Stanford University faculty
Columbia University faculty
American writers of Indian descent
Indian emigrants to the United States